"Bounce with Me" is a single by American rapper Lil' Bow Wow featuring Xscape. It is Lil' Bow Wow's debut single, taken from his debut album Beware of Dog. The single samples "Love Serenade (Part II)" by Barry White. It spent nine weeks at number 1 on the U.S. Rap Chart and number 20 on Billboard Hot 100. The song was featured in the film Big Momma's House and the trailer of Hardball. A radio remix and extended version featuring R.O.C. and Lil' Mo was also released.

Music video
The video, directed by Dave Meyers (director), features appearances by Jermaine Dupri, Jagged Edge and Da Brat. Brief clips from Big Momma's House are also included.

Charts

Weekly charts

Year-end charts

References

2000 debut singles
Bow Wow (rapper) songs
Music videos directed by Dave Meyers (director)
Xscape (group) songs
Song recordings produced by Jermaine Dupri
Songs written by Jermaine Dupri
2000 songs
So So Def Recordings singles